Galasso is both an Italian surname and a masculine Italian given name. Notable people with the name include:

Surname:
Alessio Galasso (born 1974), French rugby union player
Bob Galasso (born 1952), American baseball player
Frankie J. Galasso, American musician and actor
Gianluca Galasso (born 1984), Italian footballer
Latino Galasso (1898–1949), Italian rower
Michael Galasso (1949–2009), American composer, violinist and music director
Norberto Galasso (born 1936), Argentine historian and writer
Renata Galasso, American baseball card dealer

Given name:
Galasso Alghisi (1523–1573), Italian Renaissance architect and writer
Galasso Galassi, Italian Renaissance painter
Galasso I Pio (died 1367), lord of Carpi, Italy

Italian-language surnames
Italian masculine given names